Hannah med H is a 2003 Swedish film, about an 18-year-old girl named Hannah (Tove Edfeldt), who has just moved away from home. She meets a man named Jens (Thomas Mørk), claiming to be a teacher who admires her poetry. However, she starts to receive prank calls, and feels she is being watched. She then discovers that "Jens" is not actually called Jens, or a teacher at all. The soundtrack for this film was created by the Swedish electropop band The Knife, and released as an album, Hannah med H Soundtrack.

Cast
 Tove Edfeldt as Hannah Andersen
 Joel Kinnaman as Andreas
 Adnan Zorlak as Edin
 Bibjana Mustafaj as Milena
 Thomas Mørk as Jens Nosslin
 Anna Larsson as Anna
 Neda Kozic as Cattis (as Neda Kocic)
 Anneli Martini as Hannah's mother
 Niels Andersen as Hannah's father
 Pär Luttrop as Hannah's brother Martin
 Johanna Wilson as Martin's wife

External links
 
 

2003 films
2003 drama films
2000s Swedish-language films
Swedish drama films
2000s Swedish films